The 1912 Kansas State Aggies football team represented Kansas State Agricultural College in the 1912 college football season. They were champion of the Kansas Collegiate Athletic Conference for the third time in four seasons, although it was not officially sanctioned.

Schedule

References

Kansas State
Kansas State Wildcats football seasons
Kansas State Aggies football